Laura Fogli (born 5 October 1959) is an Italian former long-distance runner who specialized in the marathon race. She finished ninth at the 1984 Los Angeles Olympics and sixth at the 1988 Seoul Olympics. She also won silver medals at the European Championships in 1982 and 1986, and finished second in the New York City Marathon in 1983 and 1988. Her marathon victories include Rome (1982) and Pittsburgh (1986).

Career
Born in Comacchio, Foglio won the inaugural edition of the Rome City Marathon in 1982. From 1981 to 1989 she finished in the top four in eight out of nine New York City Marathons, the exception being 1987 when she did not compete.

She is married with Giuseppe Rossetti, who was also her coach. She is the coach of the Italian singer Gianni Morandi who often takes part in marathons.

Progression
Marathon
Fogil finished eight times in the top 25 world list.

Achievements
All results regarding marathon, unless stated otherwise

National titles
Laura Fogli has won two times the individual national championship.
2 wins in half marathon (1980, 1982)

See also
 Italian all-time lists - Marathon

References

External links
 

1959 births
Living people
Italian female long-distance runners
Italian female marathon runners
Athletes (track and field) at the 1984 Summer Olympics
Athletes (track and field) at the 1988 Summer Olympics
Olympic athletes of Italy
European Athletics Championships medalists
World Athletics Championships athletes for Italy
People from Comacchio
Sportspeople from the Province of Ferrara
20th-century Italian women
21st-century Italian women